Lukas Karlsson (born 21 May 1982) is a Swedish handball player, currently playing for KIF Kolding. He joined the club in 2009 from Viborg HK. Until 2007 he played for the Swedish Elitserien club Hammarby IF.

Karlsson has previously appeared for the Swedish national handball team. He is married to Norwegian international Ida Bjørndalen.

References

External links
Player info

1982 births
Living people
Swedish male handball players
Swedish expatriate sportspeople in Denmark
Viborg HK players
KIF Kolding players
People from Nyköping Municipality
Sportspeople from Södermanland County